Philip Adolphe Klier (c. 1845 in Offenbach, German Confederation – 27 March 1911 in Rangoon, British Burma), also known as Philip Klier, was a German photographer, who arrived in Burma as a young man around 1865 and spent the rest of his life there. Mainly working as self-trained photographer and businessman, Klier took hundreds of photographs at the end of the 19th century during the British colonial period in Burma. His photographs, taken both in his studio as well as on location, were sold as picture postcards for foreign visitors. They have been published in several books and collected in public archives. Among a small number of other photographers, Klier is considered as one of the earliest professional photographers in the history of today's Myanmar.

Life and work

Beginnings in Moulmein 
After having emigrated from Germany, Klier first settled in Moulmein (now Mawlamyine, Mon State), the first capital of British Burma, in 1865, and started to work as a watchmaker in a small community of German watchmakers, opticians and photographers. Having acquired the technical skills of photography under the given climatic conditions, he set up his first studio in Moulmein.

Expanding business in Rangoon 
After 1880, Klier and his family moved to the capital Rangoon, where he operated from his studio in Signal Pagoda Rd. and found better chances for selling his photographs. The customers were mainly British and other foreign officers, businessmen and visitors. For five years after 1885, Klier temporarily entered a partnership with J. Jackson, an established British studio photographer, but after that, he continued working on his own. After 1906, some of Klier's photographs were copied by the company D. A. Ahuja, (or T. N. Ahuja, Rangoon), and sometimes sold as hand-coloured postcards.

In 1907, P. Klier & Co sold photographic supplies to the growing demand by photographers and advertised ‘[t]he largest selection of views of Burma and pictorial postcards’ in Thacker's Indian Directory. The 1908 edition of Thomas Cook & Sons Burma. Information for travellers landing at Rangoon printed eight out of a total of fifteen photographs by "Messrs. P. Klier & Co", whose studio was conveniently located in a building next to Thomas Cook's travel agency.

Portraits and scenes of everyday life 

The wide range of Klier's images documents his strong interest in both colonial British as well as Burmese life and culture. Many of his photographs were printed as albumen prints, the most popular photographic printing technique of the late 19th century. As the technical possibilities of photography developed, so did his approach to presenting the subjects of his portraits: the two early portraits of young English ladies in the style of cabinet cards, taken around 1894 and archived at the National Portrait Gallery in London, or the portrait of an unknown man archived next to Klier's business card attest to the portrait style of the late 1890s. They stand in contrast with his later portraits, such as the picture of a Burmese lady on a hand-colored photoprint on postcard after an original albumen print of 1907, with a blurred background and crisp details of her person, clothes or jewellery in the foreground.

Apart from photographic portraits of Europeans and scenes of busy areas of Rangoon, Klier also carefully staged and recorded portraits of Burmese people in traditional attire, such as a princess and her following or a chief from the princely Shan States in eastern Burma shown below. Beside studio portraits for individual customers, Klier showed an interest in everyday street scenes, as by documenting traditional musicians or audiences watching the popular Burmese puppet shows (Yoke thé) of the times. Other scenes show Burmese at work, such as elephants and their keepers at work in timber yards or on paddy boats carrying rice. Klier also took photographs of famous buildings, like Burma's most important religious monument, the Shwedagon Pagoda or the great mosque in Rangoon.

Critical reception 
In his book on the history of photography in Burma, art historian Noel Francis Singer characterized Klier's approach as follows: "Klier had an eye for the unusual and many religious buildings which would have been ignored by another were fortunately immortalized by him."

Many of Klier's photographs have been archived and digitized by the British Library and the National Archives in the United Kingdom as well as by the Smithsonian Institution and Getty Images in the United States. Among others, his work has also been published as part of the photographic collection of the Guimet Museum of Asian Arts in Paris, France, the Ethnological Museum of Berlin, Germany, and in the online collection of the Nederlands Photo Museum Rotterdam.

In an 2009 auction by Bonhams in London, an album of 37 albumen prints by Klier with views and portraits in Burma was sold for US-$1,760.

Gallery

See also 
Other notable photographers of 19th-century Burma:
 John McCosh
 Felice Beato
 Linnaeus Tripe
 Willoughby Wallace Hooper
 Max Henry Ferrars

References

Further reading

External links 

 
 Burma in The Encyclopedia of Nineteenth Century Photography, p. 1317
 Collection of photographs by Philip Adolphe Klier on flickr.com
Luminous-lint: Photography: History, evolution and analysis on Klier
 88 photographs by Philip Adolphe Klier in the British Library online gallery

1845 births
1911 deaths
Photography in Myanmar
History of Myanmar
Burmese culture
19th-century German photographers
19th century in Burma
German emigrants to Myanmar